Lefevrea kibonotensis is a species of leaf beetle of Tanzania and the Democratic Republic of the Congo. It was first described by Julius Weise in 1909.

References 

Eumolpinae
Beetles of the Democratic Republic of the Congo
Taxa named by Julius Weise
Beetles described in 1909
Insects of Tanzania